A.C. Kirk may refer to:

 Alexander Carnegie Kirk (1830–1892), Scottish engineer 
 Alexander Comstock Kirk (1888–1979), United States diplomat

See also
 Alexander Kirk (disambiguation)